Ornixolinae is a subfamily of moths described by Vladimir Ivanovitsch Kuznetzov and Svetlana Vladimirovna Baryshnikova in 2001.

Diversity and distribution

Description

Biology

Genera
In alphabetical order:

Apophthisis Braun, 1915
Chileoptilia Vargas & Landry, 2005
Conopobathra Vári, 1961
Conopomorpha Meyrick, 1885
Conopomorphina Vári, 1961
Cuphodes Meyrick, 1897
Cyphosticha Meyrick, 1907
Diphtheroptila Vári, 1961
Dysectopa Vári, 1961
Epicephala Meyrick, 1980
=Iraina Diakonoff, 1955
=Leiocephala Kuznetzov & Baryschnikova, 2001
Leurocephala D.R. Davis & McKay, 2011
Liocrobyla Meyrick, 1916
Micrurapteryx Spuler, 1910
Neurobathra Ely, 1918
Neurostrota Ely, 1918
Oligoneurina Vári, 1961
Ornixola Kuznetzov, 1979
Pareclectis Meyrick, 1937
Parectopa Clemens, 1860
Philodoria Walsingham, 1907
=Euphilodoria Zimmermann, 1978
Phrixosceles Meyrick, 1908
Pogonocephala Vári, 1961
Polydema Vári, 1961
Polysoma Vári, 1961
Semnocera Vári, 1961
Spanioptila Walsingham, 1897
Spinivalva Moreira & Vargas, 2013
Stomphastis Meyrick, 1912

References

Moth subfamilies
Gracillariidae